The Identity Theft Resource Center (ITRC) is a United States non-profit organization that provides identity crime victim assistance and education, free of charge, through a toll-free call center, live chat, website, podcasts, and social media. The ITRC educates consumers, businesses, government agencies, policymakers, and other organizations on best practices for identity theft and fraud detection, reduction, and mitigation; and, serves as an objective national resource on trends related to cybersecurity, data breaches, social media, fraud, scams, and other identity issues.  

The ITRC was founded in December 1999 in San Diego, California and is a 501(c)(3) non-profit funded by a combination of competitive government grants, business services and sponsorships, and corporate donations.[1] In addition to the victim assistance services that are free of charge to individual consumers, the Center also conducts research and analysis related to identity and data privacy issues and publishes four annual reports that detail trends and impacts of identity crimes: the ITRC Data Breach Report, the ITRC Trends in Identity Crimes Report, the ITRC Consumer Impact Report, and the ITRC Small Business Impact Report. [2] 

The ITRC received a United States Department of Justice National Crime Victim Service Award in 2004.[3]  In 2019, ITRC President & CEO Eva Velasquez received a Crime Victims Service Award from the U.S. Department of Justice

See also 

 Bank fraud
 Check fraud
 Check washing
 Credit card fraud
 Fair and Accurate Credit Transactions Act
 Fair Credit Billing Act
 Fair Credit Reporting Act
 Ghosting (identity theft)
 Hacking
 Identity document forgery
 Identity fraud
 Identity theft
 Internet security
 Pharming
 Phishing
 RFID
 Spam
 Wireless identity theft

References

External links

US Resource Map of Crime Victim Services & Information

Theft Resource Center
Fraud in the United States
Non-profit organizations based in San Diego
1999 establishments in California